Ariamnes I ( Ariámnēs; fl. 4th century BC; ruled 362–350 BC) was satrap of Cappadocia under Persian suzerainty. Son of Datames and father of Ariarathes I and his brother Orophernes (Holophernes), Diodorus states that Ariamnes governed fifty years although it is unclear how this could be correct given the dates that his father Datames (ruled 385-362 BC) and his son Ariarathes I (ruled 350-331 BC) were satraps of Cappadocia.

Notes

References 
 Hazel, John; Who's Who in the Greek World, "Ariamnes I" (1999)
 Smith, William (editor); Dictionary of Greek and Roman Biography and Mythology, "Ariamnes I", Boston (1867)
 

Achaemenid satraps of Cappadocia
4th-century BC rulers